Kogarah is an electoral district of the Legislative Assembly in the Australian state of New South Wales. The electorate is located in St George. It is represented by Chris Minns of the Australian Labor Party.

Kogarah includes the suburbs of Allawah, Beverly Hills, Carlton, Carss Park, Kogarah and parts of Bexley, Bexley North, Blakehurst, Hurstville, Kingsgrove, Penshurst and South Hurstville.

History
Kogarah was created for the 1930 election, partly replacing the abolished districts of Oatley and St George. It was a marginal seat in the 1930s and 1940s but, since 1953, it became increasingly safe for Labor.

The seat was first won by former state MP for St George and Oatley, Mark Gosling of the Labor Party. However, following factionalism, splits and sectarianism within the state and federal Labor parties, the United Australia Party, later the Liberal Party, won the seat at the 1932 election. Winning back the seat in 1941, the Labor Party have since held the seat for seventy-eight of the seats ninety-three years of its existence.

Members for Kogarah

Election results

References

Kogarah
1930 establishments in Australia
Kogarah